1978 Gli dei se ne vanno, gli arrabbiati restano! ("The gods depart, the angry remain!") is the sixth album of the Jazz fusion band Area and was released in 1978, as the title says. It is the first album without guitarist Paolo Tofani, and it is also the first album whose lyrics were not written by Gianni Sassi.
Also, noticeably it is the only album in which Demetrio Stratos is credited as a composer.

Track listing

Personnel
Giulio Capiozzo – drums, vibraphone, percussion
Patrizio Fariselli – piano, organ, electric piano, synthesizer ARP Odyssey, Pro-Soloist, polymoog, omnichord
Ares Tavolazzi – electric & acoustic bass, acoustic guitar, mandola, trombone, pocket trumpet, vocals
Demetrio Stratos – vocal, organ, electric & acoustic piano, ocarina

References

1978 albums
Area (band) albums
Italian-language albums